Sol5 may refer to:
 Prosolanapyrone-II oxidase, an enzyme
 Prosolanapyrone-III cycloisomerase, an enzyme